New Reserve Bank Tower is a 28-story building in Harare, Zimbabwe. At , it is the tallest building in Zimbabwe since its completion in 1997. It serves as the headquarters of the Reserve Bank of Zimbabwe.

References

Bank headquarters
Buildings and structures in Harare
Office buildings completed in 1997
Office buildings in Zimbabwe